Targem Games is a Russian video game developer, based in Yekaterinburg, Russia, geographically in Siberia. Established in 2002, the company has created nine PC games of various genres. The company received several awards at the Russian Game Developer's Conference, including "Best Debut", "Best Game Design" and "Most innovative project".

History 
2002 - The company is founded.
2003 - Battle Mages - an original RTS/RPG mix - the very first game of the company is released in Russia. Later the game is localized into several languages including Chinese. The work on add-on and a new big project starts.
2004 - Battle Mages is released in US, Europe and China. The Add-on to Battle Mages named Battle Mages: Sign of darkness is released in Russia.
2005 - Hard Truck Apocalypse is released in Russia under the title Ex Machina and is a success there. Next year the game hits the stores of US
2006 - Hard Truck Apocalypse: Rise of Clans is released.
2007 - ExMachina: Arcade and Day Watch are released in Russia
2008 - The company acquires status of certified Xbox 360 and PlayStation 3 developers. The Swarm is released in Russia. GearGrinder is released in Russia.
2009 - for the first time the company is presented at the Game connection Europe.
GearGrinder is released world-wide.
Clutch is released world-wide. It is a first game of the company that can be bought via Steam.
2011 - Targem games' first downloadable PlayStation 3 game Armageddon Riders was released on 2 June on PSN Targem Games not only developed but also self-published it.
In May a chess game entitled Battle vs. Chess developed by Targem games was released in Europe
2012 - Targem games releases its second downloadable game for PlayStation 3 - Planets Under Attack in November. The game is also released on Steam and on XBLA with the help of Topware.

Titles 

Star Conflict was developed by Star Gem Inc., a branch of Targem Games

References

External links 
Official website  
Official website 

Russian companies established in 2002
Video game development companies
Video game companies of Russia
Video game companies established in 2002
Companies based in Yekaterinburg
Russian brands